This list of theaters in Ponce, Puerto Rico, consists of both movie theaters as well as the traditional performing arts theaters in the city of Ponce, Puerto Rico. Both historical (including no longer existing) as well a currently operating theaters are listed.  During the first half of the 20th century, most theaters have been located in the central urban zone of the city. One prominent exception is Teatro Miramar, the theater that served the Playa community in barrio Playa, Ponce. Today's cinema theaters oftentimes have several screens under a single roof.

Theater list summary table

Key:
C. = Calle (street)
NB = Northbound
SB = Southbound
WB = Westbound
EB = Eastbound

Rafael Ramos Cobian was the owner of the Victoria, Apolo, Hollywood, Universal, Belgica, Argel, and Nacional theaters; Luis Fortuño Janeiro owned the Rex; Teatro Miramar belonged to the Carlo Family. The first owner of Teatro Broadway was Rafael Napoleonis.

Gallery

Notes

Footnotes

References

Further reading

 Fay Fowlie de Flores. Ponce, Perla del Sur: Una Bibliográfica Anotada. Second Edition. 1997. Ponce, Puerto Rico: Universidad de Puerto Rico en Ponce. p. 251. Item 1269. 
 Pedro Luis Perea Rosello. "Nuevas Paginas Sobre la Historia de Ponce." Horizontes. Año 5. (Abril de 1962) pp. 79-91. (Colegio Universitario Tecnológico de Ponce, CUTPO / Pontificia Universidad Católica de Puerto Rico).

Theatres in Ponce, Puerto Rico
Neoclassical architecture in Puerto Rico
theaters
Theaters